A Curious Dream is a 1907 short drama film based on Mark Twain's short story "The Curious Dream". Twain himself provided the following testimonial: "Gentlemen: I authorize the Vitagraph Company of America to make a moving picture from my 'Curious Dream.' I have their picture of John Barter, examining his gravestone, and find it frightfully and deliciously humorous".

References

External links

1907 films
American silent short films
American black-and-white films
Films based on short fiction
Films based on works by Mark Twain
Films directed by J. Stuart Blackton
Vitagraph Studios short films
1907 drama films
1907 short films
Silent American drama films
1900s American films